is a 1999 Japanese film directed by Yasuo Furuhata. It was Japan's submission to the 72nd Academy Awards for the Academy Award for Best Foreign Language Film, but was not accepted as a nominee. It was chosen as Best Film at the Japan Academy Prize ceremony. The film was the third-highest-grossing film of the year in Japan.

Synopsis
A railway station master at a dying end-of-the-line village in Hokkaido is haunted by memories of his dead wife and daughter. When the line serving the village is scheduled for closure, an erstwhile colleague offers him a job at a resort hotel, but he is emotionally unable to part with his career as a railwayman. His life takes a turn when he meets a young woman with an interest in trains who resembles his daughter.

Cast
 Ken Takakura: Otomatsu Satō
 Shinobu Otake: Shizue Satō
 Ryōko Hirosue: Yukiko Satō
 Hidetaka Yoshioka: Hideo Sugiura
 Masanobu Andō: Toshiyuki Yoshioka
 Ken Shimura: Hajime Yoshioka
 Hirotarō Honda : Miner
 Tomoko Naraoka: Mune Katō
 Yoshiko Tanaka: Akiko Sugiura
 Nenji Kobayashi: Senji Sugiura

See also

Cinema of Japan
List of Japanese submissions for the Academy Award for Best Foreign Language Film

References

External links
 
 
 
 
 
 
 

1999 films
Films directed by Yasuo Furuhata
Films set in Hokkaido
1990s Japanese-language films
Picture of the Year Japan Academy Prize winners
Rail transport films
Films set on trains
Toei Company films
Films based on Japanese novels
1990s Japanese films